Coreopsis leavenworthii, or Leavenworth's tickseed, is an annual or short lived perennial plant species in the family Asteraceae. It is often grouped within Coreopsis tinctoria which it resembles.

Coreopsis leavenworthii typically grows 30 to 70 cm (12-28 inches) tall with yellow flower heads that sometimes have reddish-brown blotches at the base of the ray florets. The foliage is 1 or 1.5 pinnately to bipinnately compound with entire edges, and elliptic to oblanceolate to linear.

Coreopsis leavenworthii is native to the states of Florida and Alabama and blooms year round, with heaviest blooming during the months of May, June and July. It is found growing in ditches and flatwoods on moist sandy soils.

Coreopsis leavenworthii is cultivated in gardens for its attractive flowers.

References

External links
Atlas of Florida Vascular Plants

leavenworthii
Flora of the Southeastern United States
Plants described in 1842
Flora without expected TNC conservation status